The 141st Mixed Brigade was a unit of the Spanish Republican Army during the Spanish Civil War. It participated in the Battle of Belchite, Aragon Offensive, Battle of the Segre and the Catalonia Offensive.

History 
The 141st Mixed Brigade was created in May 1937 as a reserve of the Eastern Army and integrated into the 32nd Division of the X Army Corps. It was mainly made up of anarchist militiamen. Although its first commander was Sebastián Zamora Medina, shortly afterwards the command of the unit passed to Eduardo Barceló Llacuri.

After completing their training, the brigade was sent to the Huesca front. For the Zaragoza Offensive it stationed itself in Castellnou as a reserve and, on September 27, entered combat to support the XII International Brigade in the Villamayor sector. Later, Barceló was prosecuted for the shooting of a militia unit of the POUM, as was his successor, Bosch Montes. During the withdrawal from Aragón the brigade covered the Quinto sector and was overwhelmed by nationalist troops who attacked at this point, concentrating their remains in Montgay. Later the brigade took part in the fighting at the bridgehead of Balaguer, later moving to the sector of Artesa de Segre. During the Battle of the Ebro, one of the unit's battalions participated in the combat.

On January 14, 1939, while the Catalonia Offensive was taking place, the brigade was positioned in a defensive line trying to defend Cervera, although it was lost the next day. It withdrew to Calaf and later to the Manresa-Vic area to continue the general withdrawal towards the French border.

Command 
 Commanders
 Francisco del Castillo Sáenz de Tejada;
 Sebastián Zamora Medina;
 Eduardo Barceló Llacuri;
 Emilio Bosch Montes;

 Commissars
 Justino Villaverde Ramos, of the CNT;

 Chief of Staff
 Hernández Oñate;

References

Bibliography 
  
 

Military units and formations established in 1937
Military units and formations disestablished in 1939
Militarized anarchist formations
Mixed Brigades (Spain)
Military units and formations of the Spanish Civil War
Military history of Spain
Armed Forces of the Second Spanish Republic